A mar presencial (Spanish for "sea where we are present" or "zone of maritime presence") or heritage marine reserve is a zone of influence demarcated by a maritime country in the high seas adjacent to its exclusive economic zone (EEZ). The objective of this oceanopolitical concept or doctrine, is to signal to third parties where the coastal country's interests are, or could be directly involved.

Under this principle, a coastal nation (or several coastal nations, collectively) will demarcate areas of high seas contiguous or adjacent to their EEZ. Without claiming sovereignty over the international water in these areas, this demarcation serves as an announcement of a national interest in preserving the whole demarcated area from abusive uses or from certain activities whose proximity could impact marine resources inhabiting the nation's EEZ. A common stated intent is protecting highly migratory transboundary fish stocks  from overfishing and ocean dumping.

Definition 

A mar presencial occurs when a state declares an interest in a maritime space, while still recognizing the liberties of any international waters it encompasses, in accordance with the United Nations Convention on the Law of the Sea. The objective of the policy is to ensure rational exploitation of resources, avoiding the overexploitation and subsequent collapse of delicate marine ecosystem equilibria. Part of the idea is that every coastal nation has a sovereign right to subsistence. If marine resources are intercepted and exhausted before they enter the EEZ and territorial waters of coastal states, these states will be deprived of oceanic resources which they would otherwise harvest in their jurisdictional waters. Accordingly, a state can prevent ships that are overexploiting its mar presencial from calling its ports. The legal basis of this theory was partially weakened as a results of the 1995 Straddling Fish Stocks Agreement, which dealt with the management of transboundary species and highly migratory fish that freely travel between high seas and EEZs. A concrete application of the theory of mar presencial occurred during the 1995 Turbot War, a conflict caused by the capture of a Spanish fishing vessel by the Canadian military.

Origin of the concept 
The "Theory of the Mar Presencial" was developed by a Commander-in-Chief of the Chilean Navy, Admiral Jorge Martínez Busch. First presented in a master's class on May 4, 1990, it was expanded in another master's class on May 2, 1991. The definition was later broadened into a more general concept of greater utility, and applicable to coastal states worldwide.

US Naval JAG officer Jane Dalton defined a mar presencial as

Countries that have expressed mar presencial interests 
Most of the countries that have expressed mar presencial interests have been neighbors of Chile, or on the Pacific coast of the Americas, especially South America. Besides Chile, Argentina, Ecuador, Peru, and Colombia have all proposed maritime areas that match the concept of mar presencial. While Canada has not explicitly proposed a mar presencial, it acted in a manner consistent with the concept during the Turbot War.

Chile 
Chile created this theory, and was the first to implement one in 1991, with the passage of law N°19080. Article 1, final paragraph, defines the concept of a "mar presencial" for the southeastern quadrant of the Pacific Ocean:

As a result of this Chile had an international dispute with the European Union over swordfish. The preliminary treaty gave international backing to the mar presencial theory.
The mar presencial concept has been legally enshrined by Chilean legislation in the General Law of Fishing, the Basic General Law of the Environment, and in the law of Nuclear Security.

Colombia, Ecuador, Peru and Chile 
Under the 1997  “Acuerdo Marco para la Conservación de los Recursos Vivos Marinos en la Alta Mar del Pacífico Sudeste” or the "Galapagos Agreement" , Colombia, Ecuador, Peru, and Chile proposed a "Regional Mar Presencial of the CPPS» (Comisión Permanente del Pacífico Sur). This agreement attempts to protect certain species of migratory fish, including in international waters. Additional steps have been taken to establish a Southeast Pacific Marine Protected Area.

Argentina 
In Argentina Senator Mariano Utrera led a legislative project to mark out a mar presencial space called "Fixein the borders of the "Argentinian National Heritage Sea Reserve." The law was presented to the Senate and Chamber of Deputies November 27, 1987.

On April 30, 1989, the proposed legislation expired without being passed. However the concept can still be observed in what is referred to as "La Milla 201" (referring to the first mile outside of the EEZ), where Argentina carries out regular patrols against illegal fishing.

Canada 
The Turbot War between Canada and Spain generated a concrete application of the theory. Canada fired shots across the bow and seized the Spanish fishing trawler Estai in waters adjacent to its EEZ, which caused the European Union to get involved. The case went to the Hague, was judged in Canada's favor, and Spain was forced to pay a substantial fine.

Further reading

References

Law of the sea
Fisheries law